

United Republic of Tanzania at the 1994 Commonwealth Games was abbreviated TAN.

Medals

Gold
none

Silver
none

Bronze
Matumla Hassan — Boxing, Men's Featherweight

See also
Tanzania at the 1992 Summer Olympics
Tanzania at the 1996 Summer Olympics

References
Commonwealth Games Federation

 

C
Nations at the 1994 Commonwealth Games